Honneponnetje  is a 1988 Dutch film directed by Ruud van Hemert.

Plot 

A teenage nun escapes the convent to discover the real world outside. Her parents however believe that she's kidnapped.

Cast 
  - Honneponnetje
 Marc Hazewinkel - Harry
 Hans Man in 't Veld - Evert, vader van Honneponnetje
 Marijke Merckens - Gerda, moeder van Honneponnetje
  - Desiderius
  - Apollo Romansky

External links 
 

Dutch romantic comedy films
1988 films
1980s Dutch-language films
Golan-Globus films